Giwargis II was Patriarch of the Church of the East from 828 to 831.

Sources 
Brief accounts of Giwargis's patriarchate are given in the Ecclesiastical Chronicle of the Jacobite writer Bar Hebraeus (floruit 1280) and in the ecclesiastical histories of the Nestorian writers Mari (twelfth-century), Amr (fourteenth-century) and Sliba (fourteenth-century).  Modern assessments of his reign can be found in Jean-Maurice Fiey's Chrétiens syriaques sous les Abbassides and David Wilmshurst's The Martyred Church.

Giwargis's patriarchate 
The following account of Giwargis's patriarchate is given by Mari:

Giwargis was a native of al-Karkh, and superior of the monastery of Beth Abe.  He was a very prudent and intelligent man, but had little knowledge of doctrine.  He once approached Gabriel ibn Bokhtisho, and asked him to divide equally an estate which a man had seized from him.  Gabriel saw that he was a righteous man, and at his request Timothy appointed him metropolitan of Jundishapur, where he remained for twenty years.  He was elected after the death of Isho Bar Nun by Gabriel and Mikha'il, but was unsuitable on account of his great age, as he was nearly a hundred years old and suffered from sciatica.   He was appointed in the year 210, and needed the support of two men or a stick whenever he wanted to walk.  He died at the age of 104, and was buried in the monastery of Klilisho.  The length of his catholicate was four years.

See also
 List of patriarchs of the Church of the East

Notes

References
 Abbeloos, J. B., and Lamy, T. J., Bar Hebraeus, Chronicon Ecclesiasticum (3 vols, Paris, 1877)
 Assemani, J. A., De Catholicis seu Patriarchis Chaldaeorum et Nestorianorum (Rome, 1775)
 Brooks, E. W., Eliae Metropolitae Nisibeni Opus Chronologicum (Rome, 1910)
 Fiey, J. M., Chrétiens syriaques sous les Abbassides, surtout à Bagdad (749–1258) (Louvain, 1980)
 Gismondi, H., Maris, Amri, et Salibae: De Patriarchis Nestorianorum Commentaria I: Amri et Salibae Textus (Rome, 1896)
 Gismondi, H., Maris, Amri, et Salibae: De Patriarchis Nestorianorum Commentaria II: Maris textus arabicus et versio Latina (Rome, 1899)
 Wilmshurst, David, The Martyred Church: A History of the Church of the East (London, 2011).

External links 

Patriarchs of the Church of the East
9th-century bishops of the Church of the East
Nestorians in the Abbasid Caliphate
831 deaths
Year of birth unknown